Bilton Grange may refer to:

Bilton Grange, a preparatory school located in Dunchurch, Warwickshire. 
Bilton Grange Senior High School, former school in Kingston  upon Hull
Bilton Grange Estate - Hull Corporation built housing estate in Kingston upon Hull